Roberto Luis Carnaghi (born May 13, 1938) is an Argentine actor who has appeared in 44 films, about 60 plays, more than 50 television programmes, and nearly 100 advertisements.

Biography
Carnaghi was born on May 13, 1938 in Avellaneda. He studied acting at the school of the Teatro Municipal de San Isidro and the National School of Drama, where he graduated in 1966.

He began his professional career as a stage actor in the Teatro General San Martin. His stage roles have included major roles in several plays of William Shakespeare, including King Lear and The Merchant of Venice.

Roberto Carnaghi got his start in advertising at the James Walter Thompson advertising agency. He was initially rejected, as his face was not up to standards, but he was eventually hired, and worked in nearly 100 advertisements, promoting brands such as Ford and Citroen. His work allowed him to work in TV in the 1980s, as well as some minor film roles. He became famous with his jobs at the talk shows of Tato Bores. He has worked in several genres and mediums along the years; his work with Tato Bores was comedic and his contemporary theater plays were dramas. He also worked for comedians Antonio Gasalla and Guillermo Francella.

He worked in the 2006 Argentine telenovela Montecristo, and his character referenced the kidnapping of babies of the Argentine guerrillas killed during the 1970s Dirty War. Although he is completely against such action, he tried to avoid making his character inherently evil, proposed to include in the script that he was married to an infertile wife. In that year he also received the Gold ACE Award, for his 40 years of work. 
  
In 2012 he took part in the successful telenovela Graduados. Carnaghi and Mirta Busnelli played the parents of a Jewish family; he pointed that his relation with his sons differs from his character. He received a Tato Award as supporting actor, and he was declared a "featured personality of culture" by the legislature of the Buenos Aires city. This recognition, proposed by the legislator María José Lubertino, is complemented by a similar one from his home neighbourhood of Villa Urquiza.

Film

Television

Theater 
  The Crucible, 2012
 El patio de la morocha, 2011 
 Mateo
 King Lear, 2009. Role: Earl of Gloucester
 La vuelta al mundo 
 La jaula de las locas
 King Lear, 2006
 La zapatera prodigiosa
 The Resistible Rise of Arturo Ui
 Discepolín y Yo
 Mrs. Warren's Profession
 Anfitrión
 Shylock (an adaptation of The Merchant of Venice), 1999. Role: Shylock
 Alice in Wonderland
 El jardín de los cerezos
 Richard III
 Morgan
 Peer Gynt
 El burlador de Sevilla
 La opera de dos centavos
 Three Sisters, 1987. Role: Chebutikin
 Tartufo
 Los pilares de la sociedad
 Cuatro caballetes 
 No hay que llorar 
 Primaveras 
 Babilonia 
 Bienaventurados 
 Subterráneo Buenos Aires 
 Los cuernos de Don Friolera 
 Santa Juana 
 El mago 
 La historia del soldado 
 El pibe de oro 
 Hamlet. Role: Polonius
 Escenas de la calle
 El alcalde dé Zalamea 
 Casamiento entre vivos y muertos 
 Don Juan
 Cyrano de Bergerac 
 Macbeth 
 El casamiento de Laucha

Awards

Nominations
 2013 Martín Fierro Awards
 Best secondary actor (for ''En terapia)

References

External links

 
 Cine Nacional 
 Alternativa Teatral 

1938 births
20th-century Argentine male actors
21st-century Argentine male actors
Argentine male actors
Living people
People from Buenos Aires Province
People from Avellaneda